Frank McLeavy, Baron McLeavy (1 January 1899 – 1 October 1976) was a British Labour Party politician.

McLeavy became a road passenger transport officer.  He joined the Labour Party, serving on Cheshire County Council from 1938 until 1950, and as Mayor of Bebington from 1939 to 1941.

At the 1945 general election, he was elected as Member of Parliament for Bradford East, holding his seat until he retired from the House of Commons at the 1966 general election.

On 11 September 1967, he was made a life peer as Baron McLeavy, of the City of Bradford. He died in 1976, aged 77.

References

External links
 

 

1899 births
1976 deaths
British people of Irish descent
Macleavy
Labour Party (UK) MPs for English constituencies
Transport and General Workers' Union-sponsored MPs
UK MPs 1945–1950
UK MPs 1950–1951
UK MPs 1951–1955
UK MPs 1955–1959
UK MPs 1959–1964
UK MPs 1964–1966
UK MPs who were granted peerages
Place of birth missing
Place of death missing
Politicians from Bradford
Life peers created by Elizabeth II